Raffles Christian School is an international school in Kelapa Gading, Pondok Indah, and Kebon Jeruk in Jakarta, Indonesia.
The school grew from 136 students in 2007 to 3000 in 2018, across three campuses including pre-school, primary, secondary, and junior college.

Kelapa Gading campus
Raffles Christian School Kelapa Gading is an international K–12 school located in North Jakarta that offers the Singapore and Cambridge curriculum. The school has produced outstanding results in the Cambridge Primary Checkpoint, Cambridge Secondary Checkpoint, Cambridge IGCSE, AS and A Levels with some of its students getting the Top in Indonesia and Top in the World recognition from Cambridge.

It has also consistently produced scholars who have been admitted to Singapore's Bukit Panjang Government High School.

Curriculum
The school is a certified Cambridge Centre for International Examinations (CIE) offering an international curriculum in the Cambridge Primary Checkpoint, IGCSE and International A-level examinations and is a member of the Association of Christian Schools International (ACSI).

The school provides the Global Assessment Certificate (GAC), which is one of the world's most recognized university preparation program which guarantees entry into universities worldwide and is also a test centre for the Advanced Placement Examination (College Board).

External links

School website

Educational institutions established in 2005
International schools in Indonesia
Cambridge schools in Indonesia
Christian schools in Indonesia
Schools in Jakarta
2005 establishments in Indonesia